The following articles describe various historical rankings of heads of government for different countries.
 Historical rankings of presidents of the United States
 Historical rankings of prime ministers of Australia
 Historical rankings of prime ministers of Canada
 Historical rankings of prime ministers of the Netherlands
 Historical rankings of prime ministers of the United Kingdom
 Historical rankings of chancellors of Germany

See also
 List of longest-reigning monarchs
 United States presidential approval rating

Historical
Heads of government